Esperiopsis is a genus of demosponges, comprising around 30 species found in oceans around the world.

Species
As of 2014, the following valid species of Esperiopsis are recognized:

 Esperiopsis bathyalis Lopes & Hajdu, 2004
 Esperiopsis challengeri (Ridley, 1885)
 Esperiopsis chindoensis Sim, 1995
 Esperiopsis cimensis van Soest, Beglinger & De Voogd, 2012
 Esperiopsis crassofibrosa Brøndsted, 1924
 Esperiopsis decora Topsent, 1904
 Esperiopsis diasolenia Lévi, 1993
 Esperiopsis ferruginea Whitelegge, 1906
 Esperiopsis flagellum Lundbeck, 1905
 Esperiopsis flava Lévi, 1993
 Esperiopsis heardi Boury-Esnault & van Beveren, 1982
 Esperiopsis incognita Stephens, 1916
 Esperiopsis inodes Lévi, 1993
 Esperiopsis lingua (Koltun, 1970)
 Esperiopsis macrosigma Stephens, 1916
 Esperiopsis magnifolia Lévi, 1993
 Esperiopsis megachela Dendy, 1924
 Esperiopsis papillata (Vosmaer, 1880)
 Esperiopsis plumosa Tanita, 1965
 Esperiopsis praedita Topsent, 1890
 Esperiopsis profunda Ridley & Dendy, 1886
 Esperiopsis pulchella Ridley & Dendy, 1886
 Esperiopsis radiata (Topsent, 1927)
 Esperiopsis scotiae Topsent, 1915
 Esperiopsis stipula Koltun, 1958
 Esperiopsis strongylatus (Alander, 1942)
 Esperiopsis strongylophora Vacelet, 1969
 Esperiopsis varia Sarà, 1978
 Esperiopsis variussigma Hoshino, 1981
 Esperiopsis villosa (Carter, 1874)

References

External links

Poecilosclerida